Raikode is a village in Sangareddy district of Telangana, India.

References

Villages in Sangareddy district